The Shields Stories was a Canadian television drama series, which aired on W in 2004. A short-run dramatic anthology series produced by Shaftesbury Films, the series dramatized six short stories by Carol Shields.

The series was a sequel of sorts to Shaftesbury's prior The Atwood Stories, which dramatized six short stories by another Canadian writer, Margaret Atwood. A third series, which would have dramatized short stories by Alice Munro, was planned but did not materialize.

The series was a Gemini Award nominee for Best Drama Series at the 19th Gemini Awards.

Episodes

References

External links

 

2000s Canadian drama television series
2004 Canadian television series debuts
2004 Canadian television series endings
Television series by Shaftesbury Films
2000s Canadian anthology television series
W Network original programming